Robert Oubron (18 April 1913 – 7 February 1989) was a French racing cyclist. He rode in the 1937 Tour de France.

References

1913 births
1989 deaths
French male cyclists
Place of birth missing
Cyclo-cross cyclists